Brian Carroll (born 13 June 1983) is an Irish hurler who played as a right corner-forward for the Offaly senior team.

Born in Coolderry, County Offaly, Carroll was introduced to hurling by his father, Pat Carroll, a two-time All-Ireland medallist with Offaly. His grandfather, Jack Carroll, and his great-grandfather, "Red" Jack Teehan, also played hurling at various levels with Offaly. Carroll enjoyed All-Ireland success at colleges level with St. Kieran's College while simultaneously enjoying championship successes at underage levels with the Coolderry club. A one-time All-Ireland runner-up with the Coolderry senior team, Carroll has won one Leinster medal and five championship medals.

Carroll made his debut on the inter-county scene at the age of sixteen when he first linked up with the Offaly minor team. A Leinster medallist in this grade, he later played with the under-21 team. Carroll made his senior debut during the 2002 Walsh Cup. He went on to play a key role for Offaly in attack during a lengthy career, and won two National Hurling League (Division 2) medals. He was a Leinster runner-up on one occasion.

Carroll's career tally of 5 goals and 194 points ranks him as Offaly's second highest championship scorer of all time.

As a member of the Leinster inter-provincial team, Carroll won four Railway Cup medals. Throughout his inter-county career he made 47 championship appearances. Carroll retired from inter-county hurling on 4 January 2016.

Playing career

Club

Carroll plays his club hurling with Coolderry and has enjoyed much success and had made the all star team

In 2004 he lined out in his first county club championship final. Six-in-a-row hopefuls Birr provided the opposition, however, Coolderry recorded a 3-10 to 2-11 victory against the odds. It was Carroll's first championship medal.

After losing two county finals in the meantime, Coolderry reached the championship decider once again in 2010. Reigning champions Tullamore were the opponents, however, Coolderry secured a 3-15 to 1-12 victory. It was Carroll's second championship medal.

Coolderry made it two-in-a-row in 2011, with Carroll winning a third championship meal following a 2-14 to 0-16 defeat of Birr. He later added a Leinster medal to his collection following a 1-15 to 1-11 defeat of Oulart the Ballagh in the provincial decider. Coolderry subsequently qualified for an All-Ireland final meeting with Loughgiel Shamrocks. A hat-trick of goals by Liam Watson resulted in a 4-13 to 0-17 defeat for Carrol's side.

Inter-county

Carroll made his senior debut for Offaly in a Walsh Cup game against Dublin in 2002. After scoring 1-2 in his competitive debut, he was later included on Offaly's league and championship teams.

In 2005 Carroll enjoyed his first major success with Offaly. A 6-21 to 4-7 trouncing of Carlow gave him his first National Hurling League (Division 2) medal. Unfortunately, championship success continued to elude the team.

After being relegated from the top tier of the league, Offaly reached the Division 2 final once again in 2009. A 1-13 to 0-13 defeat of Wexford gave Carroll a second Division 2 medal.

In January 2016, Carroll announced his retirement from inter-county hurling.
In a released statement he said "It is with both satisfaction and sadness that I announce my retirement from inter-county hurling, for the past 14 seasons I have been privileged to play for Offaly and got to fulfil my boyhood dream of captaining my county in 2010, playing in a Leinster final in Croke Park in 2004 and, probably most importantly for me, the general buzz of playing inter-county hurling with and against the best in the country."

Inter-provincial

Carroll has also lined out with Leinster in the inter-provincial series of games and has enjoyed much success winning 4 Railway Cup medals in 2002, 2003, 2008 and 2009. In 2003 he won a Railway Cup medal as Leinster defeated Connacht by 4-9 to 2-12.

Career statistics

References

1983 births
Living people
Coolderry hurlers
Irish schoolteachers
Leinster inter-provincial hurlers
Offaly inter-county hurlers